The 1866 Connecticut gubernatorial election was held on April 2, 1866. Civil War general and Republican nominee Joseph Roswell Hawley defeated Democratic nominee James E. English with 50.30% of the vote.

As this was the first election held after the American Civil War, some aspects of the National Union Party were still present. The Republican convention held in Hartford on February 14 still sometimes referred to itself as the "Union" convention, and it passed a resolution expressing confidence in President Andrew Johnson. The party would split with Johnson later that same year, and all references to the National Union label were dropped by the end of the 1860s.

General election

Candidates
Major party candidates

Joseph Roswell Hawley, Republican/National Union
James E. English, Democratic

Results

References

1866
Connecticut
Gubernatorial